J12 may refer to:

Vehicles

Aircraft 
 Nanchang J-12, a prototype Chinese fighter

Automobiles 
 Hispano-Suiza J12, a French luxury car
 Subaru J12, a Japanese hatchback

Ships 
 , a Visby-class destroyer of the Swedish Navy

Other uses 
 Chanel J12, a Swiss-made watch
 County Route J12 (California)
 Equilateral triangular bipyramid, a Johnson solid (J12)
 Marlboro Pike Line, a bus route in the Washington Metro Area
 Viral pneumonia